Badgerys Creek, also known as Badgery's Creek, is a suburb of Sydney, in the state of New South Wales, Australia, located approximately  west of the Sydney central business district, in the local government areas of the City of Liverpool. It is part of the Greater Western Sydney region and is adjacent to Kemps Creek, Austral and the Blue Mountains (New South Wales).

The suburb is best known as being the most favoured site for a Second Sydney Airport. In April 2014, the Abbott Government confirmed the construction of  the Western Sydney Airport, initially scheduling construction in 2016, but construction actually began in September 2018 and is scheduled for completion in 2026.

History
James Badgery was a British-born farmer and miller who, in 1806, was granted  in the suburb that bears his name today. His original land grant was on the north side of Elizabeth Drive; land which today is used for farming research by the CSIRO and University of Sydney. Badgery named his property Exeter Farm but the creek running through the property became known as Badgery's Creek and that name was eventually applied to the local area.

Badgery bought other land to the south of his grant and after he died, the area was subdivided in the 1880s, vastly increasing the local population. Badgerys Creek Post Office opened on 10 July 1894 and closed in 1989.

In 1986, the Federal Government announced that the Second Sydney Airport would be sited at Badgerys Creek. The government bought a number of properties for that purpose, and as a result of that, as well as concerns about living near an airport, many people moved away, meaning that by 1996 there were fewer than 500 residents. By 2016 the population had further shrunk to 225. Construction of the airport hadn't started, but in 2012 an 8 million report into Sydney's aviation needs found that Badgerys Creek remained the best site, with construction subsequently scheduled to start in 2016.

Geography
Badgerys Creek flows north into a reservoir in the suburb's north, as does South Creek, the suburb's eastern boundary. West of the reservoir lies Mills Hill, and south-west of that, by just over a kilometre, is Raymond Hill,  .

Climate
Badgerys Creek has a humid subtropical climate (Cfa) with hot summers, which vary from dry to humid, and cool winters. Due to its open grassy location, nighttime temperatures are slightly cooler than the nearby suburban areas in western Sydney. There is the occasional frost in some winter mornings, where the months from April to September have recorded severe frost. Most of the rain falls in late summer and early autumn, which is usually accompanied by a thunderstorm. Due to the foehn effect, the driest months are in late winter and early spring, which have the most sunniest days. 

Commercial area
North of Elizabeth Drive, a substantial amount of land is taken up by the CSIRO Research Station, the University of Sydney MacGarvie Smith Veterinary Farm, and a landfill depot. Much of the research establishment is dotted with reservoirs. The southeast includes a brickworks, and land owned by Telstra, also featuring a number of reservoirs. The suburb is also home to the Hubertus Liverpool Rifle Club.

South of Elizabeth Drive was also a settled area.

Schools
The suburb had one primary school, Badgerys Creek Public School, decommissioned in 2014 to make way for Sydney's second airport. Nearby there were two churches with cemeteries, also moved.

Demographics
In the 2016 Census, there were 225 people in Badgerys Creek. 68.5% of people were born in Australia and 57.5% of people only spoke English at home.

Parks
The suburb is home to Badgerys Creek Park. A toilet block formerly provided has been demolished.

References

Suburbs of Sydney
City of Liverpool (New South Wales)
City of Penrith
Resumed localities in Australia